Ruth Jepkoech Kutol (born 16 May 1973) is a Kenyan long-distance and marathon runner. She won the 2000 Venice Marathon, 2003 Madrid, Venice and Dublin Marathons, 2007 Luxembourg Marathon, and 2010 Tallinn Marathon.

Personal life
Kutol is from Eldoret, Kenya. She has six sisters and two brothers, and also has a daughter.

Career
Kutol won the Marseille-Cassis Classique Internationale in 1998, one second off the course record. At the 2000 World Cross Country Championships she finished tenth in the long race, while the Kenyan team of which Kutol was a part won the silver medal in the team competition.

In 2000, Kutol won the Venice Marathon, the first competitive marathon that she had run. In 2001, Kutol came second in a  race in San Sebastián, Spain. In the same year, she came second in the Paris Marathon, losing in a sprint by one second to fellow Kenyan Florence Barsosio.

In 2003, Kutol won the Madrid and Venice Marathons. Later in the year, she won the Dublin Marathon in a record time of 2:27.22, which was over five minutes faster than her previous best. Her record time stood until 2010, when it was beaten by Russian Tatyana Aryasova. In 2004, Kutol won the Paris Half Marathon in a time of 1:11:13.

Kutol took a two-year break from competition in order to have a baby, and returned in 2007. In that year, she won the Luxembourg Marathon in a time of 2:41:26. In 2010, Kutol won the Tallinn Marathon. In 2011, she came third at the Kuala Lumpur Marathon. In 2012, she came 21st overall and second woman at the February Bangkok Marathon, which had been postponed from 2011 due to flooding.

Achievements

References

External links

1973 births
Living people
Kenyan female long-distance runners
Kenyan female cross country runners
People from Uasin Gishu County